Hajji Madad (also Romanized as Ḩājjī Madad; also known as Kalāteh-ye Ḩājjī Madad) is a village in Pol Khatun Rural District, Marzdaran District, Sarakhs County, Razavi Khorasan Province, Iran. At the 2006 census, its population was 147, in 29 families.

References 

Populated places in Sarakhs County